Camelback Ridge is a short rock ridge in Antarctica, with topographic highs of  at the ends, located just west of Pemmican Bluff in the Jones Mountains. It was mapped by the University of Minnesota Jones Mountains Party, 1960–61, who named it for its humped appearance.

References
 

Ridges of Ellsworth Land